Ioesse is a genus of longhorn beetles of the subfamily Lamiinae, containing the following species:

 Ioesse putaoensis Ohbayashi & Lin, 2012
 Ioesse rubra (Pic, 1925)
 Ioesse sanguinolenta Thomson, 1864

References

Petrognathini